Surya Saputra (born in Jakarta, Indonesia on July 5, 1975) is an Indonesian actor, singer, and model. He is the husband of Indonesian actress and singer, Cynthia Lamusu. He is also a former member of the Indonesian pop group Cool Colors.

Career
Saputra has appeared in the soap operas Air Mata Ibu, Cerita Cinta, Remaja Lima, Cinta Abadi, Romantika 21, Strawberry, Metropolis 2, Senyuman Ananda, and Arisan! 2 The Series. He has appeared in the films Janji Joni, Gie, Untuk Rena, Arisan!, Belahan Jiwa and Long Road to Heaven, which is about the Bali terrorist bombing. Saputra won "Best Supporting Actor" for his work in Arisan! at the 2004 Indonesian Film Festival.

Saputra has also worked as a film producer. He appeared on the reality show Celebrity Dance teamed up with Cynthia Lamusu. He is also a former member of Surya the boy group Cool Colors, along with Ari Wibowo (replacing Teuku Ryan), Ari Sihasale, and Yohandi Yahya.

On 2 April 2016, Saputra had received a special award, 7 Icon Usmar Ismail Awards, together with a senior Widyawati, Tio Pakusadewo, Dwi Sasono, Lenny Marlina, Sissy Pricillia, and Prisia Nasution at the 2016 Usmar Ismail Awards.

Personal life
Saputra married singer Dewi Sandra in 2000 and they were divorced in January 2005. Saputra married Cynthia Lamusu of the girl group Be3 on 8 June 2008. Saputra and Lamusu became parents to baby twins, both girl and boy, which were born on 20 November 2016.

Filmography

Film

Television

Television film

Awards and nominations

References

External links
  Profil di wowkeren.com
 
 
 

1975 births
Indonesian actors
21st-century Indonesian male singers
People from Jakarta
Betawi people
Indo people
Indonesian people of Australian descent
Living people